Nicole Monique Wray (born May 2, 1981), also known as Lady Wray, is an American singer and songwriter. Her 1998 debut single "Make It Hot" was certified gold. In the 2010s, she began pursuing a more traditional soul sound, first as part of the duo Lady with Terri Walker and subsequently as Lady Wray. As Lady Wray, she has released two albums: Queen Alone (2016) and Piece of Me (2022).

Early life 
Nicole Monique Wray was born on May 2, 1979, in Salinas, California, to Debra Wray (née Murphy) and Kenneth Wray. Her older brother Kenny Wray is also a singer and she has younger sister Myrtis Wray. At a young age, Wray relocated to Portsmouth, Virginia. She became one of her church's star choir members and also participated in local fashion shows. During her teenage years, Wray was introduced to then-upcoming rapper Missy Elliott, who was looking for a female singer to sign to her own recording label The Goldmind Inc. Wray impressed Elliott by performing SWV's song "Weak" and became the first recording artist on Elliott's label as well as securing a distribution deal with Elektra Records.

Career

1997–2002: Make It Hot and split from The Goldmind Inc./Elektra 
In 1997, Wray appeared as a featured vocalist on the song "Gettaway" for Missy Elliott's first album Supa Dupa Fly. In June 1998, Wray released her first single "Make It Hot". The single peaked in the top-five on Billboard'''s Hot 100, and received certified gold-status within six weeks of its release for a total of over 700,000 copies sold.

On August 25, 1998, Wray released her first album Make It Hot. The album only achieved moderated success, peaking at forty-two on Billboard Top 200 Albums and ninety-one on the UK Albums Chart. Following the issue of the album, Wray toured as the opening act and background vocalist for Elliott's concert tour. The album's follow-up singles "I Can't See" and "Eyes Better Not Wander" failed to crossover with the latter only peaking at seventy-one on the Hot R&B/Hip-Hop Songs chart in 1999. In September 1999, Missy Elliott released her single "All n My Grill", which featured Wray, Big Boi, and MC Solaar. The single achieved success in European markets and even garnered a gold-status certification by the SNEP.

In 2000, Wray began recording her original second album titled Elektric Blue. In July 2001, she released the single "I'm Lookin'" which was planned to be the lead single. Following the single's moderate performance on the R&B chart, the album Elektric Blue was subjected to several postponed dates and was ultimately shelved when Wray decided to leave The Goldmind Inc and Elektra Records in 2001. In 2002, gospel duo Pam & Dodi released "Don't Have To", a gospel and pop song written by Wray. The song was featured as the lead single of the duo's self-titled album.

 2003–2011: Lovechild 
In June 2003, Wray released a single "Welcome Home" with rapper Ol' Dirty Bastard. Later that year, Wray secured a recording contract with Roc-A-Fella Records. In November 2004, Wray issued a single "If I Was Your Girlfriend", originally planned to be the lead single of her forthcoming album Lovechild. The single spent twenty weeks on R&B chart but ultimately peaked at fifty-seven. Later that year, Wray experienced a brief roster move from Roc-A Fella to Def Jam Records to ultimately the Dame Dash Music Group. The album Lovechild was scheduled to be released in April 2005 but was shelved after the Dame Dash Music Group became defunct. During her time on the Dame Dash Music Group, Wray made a cameo appearance in movie State Property 2.

In July 2005, Wray and Mike Jones released "Still Tippin' (It's a Man's World) (Remix)" on the soundtrack of American drama film Hustle & Flow. Still maintaining her work relationship with Damon Dash, Wray performed on The Black Keys rock and hip-hop fusion album titled Blakroc, released in November 2009. Wray was then enlisted to add her background vocals on The Black Keys' album, Brothers, which was published in May 2010. In June 2010, Wray released Boss Chick which featured unreleased music from years prior. A single titled "I Like It" was issued from the album. In 2011, Wray and 7 Aurelius released a compilation album Dream Factory Sessions which featured unreleased songs recorded in 2004.7 Aurelius + Nicole Wray – Dream Factory Sessions. discogs. Retrieved: December 11, 2021.

 2012–2014: Lady and Truth & Soul Records
In 2012, Wray formed a retro-soul duo called Lady with Terri Walker, a singer she met in 2009. Lady became the background vocalists for American soul singer Lee Fields during his Lee Fields and The Expressions Tour in 2012. During the tour, Lady recorded their self-titled album and released it in March 2013 on Truth and Soul Records. The album spawned three singles: "Money", "Get Ready", and "Good Lovin'". Heavily influenced by 1960/70s soul music, the album was a success and allowed the duo headline their own concert tour. During their tour, Walker departed from the music act to pursue her solo career. Wray renamed the music act as "Lady, the Band" and continued on with the addition of two background singers for the conclusion of the tour. After the roster move from Truth and Soul Records to Big Crown Records, Wray adopted the stage name Lady Wray.

 2016–present: Queen Alone and Piece of Me
In June 2016, Wray released "Do It Again", the lead single of her second album Queen Alone. In July 2016, she released the second single "Guilty", a song inspired by her brother's incarceration. In September 2016, Wray issued her second album Queen Alone on Big Crown Records. The album retained a similar retro-soul sound as her earlier project with Lady. Wray continued to promote the album with the issue of the singles "Smiling" and "Underneath My Feet".

In 2019, Wray released two singles: "Piece of Me" and "Come On In". The following year, she issued another single "Storms". In mid-2021, she released another single "Games People Play". Later that year, she issued two more singles: "Under the Sun" and "Through It All". Her third solo album Piece of Me was released on January 28, 2022.

 Personal life 
In June 2018, Wray gave birth to her daughter Melody Bacote. In April 2020, Wray married musician Dante Bacote.

Discography

 Make It Hot (1998)
 Queen Alone (2016)
 Piece of Me (2022)

 Filmography 
Films
 State Property 2 (2005)

Television
 The Wayans Bros.'' (1998)

References

External links
 
 
 
 

1979 births
20th-century American actresses
20th-century American singers
20th-century American women singers
21st-century American actresses
21st-century American singers
21st-century American women singers
African-American actresses
African-American women singers
African-American women singer-songwriters
American child singers
American contemporary R&B singers
American dance musicians
American women hip hop singers
American women pop singers
American women singer-songwriters
American film actresses
Living people
Musicians from Portsmouth, Virginia
People from Salinas, California
Roc-A-Fella Records artists
Singer-songwriters from California
Singer-songwriters from Virginia